Penrhyn Avenue is a cricket ground in Colwyn Bay, Wales. The ground was first used by the Glamorgan 1st XI in 1966, although County Championship matches have only been an annual fixture since 1990 (with the exception of 1991 and 1996). In 2015, the ground hosted a County Championship match against Lancashire, during which Lancashire batsmen Ashwell Prince and Alviro Petersen put on a ground record partnership of 501 for the third wicket. The ground was most recently used by Glamorgan in 2019 for a County Championship match, against Lancashire. A proposed game in 2022 was moved to Cardiff and Glamorgan will not play at Penrhyn Avenue in 2023.

The ground has hosted 32 first-class matches and 28 List A matches, as well as several matches in the Minor Counties Championship, both for Denbighshire and the Wales Minor Counties.

Records

First-class
Highest team score – 718/3dec Glamorgan v. Sussex, 22–25 August 2000
Lowest team score – no team has ever been bowled out for less than 100 on this ground
Best batting performance – 309 not out Steve James for Glamorgan v. Sussex, 22–25 August 2000
Best bowling performance – 9/49 Tony Cordle for Glamorgan v. Leicestershire, 21–24 June 1969

List A
Highest team score – 292/6 – Glamorgan Dragons v. Leicestershire Foxes, 10 August 2008
Lowest team score – no team has ever been bowled out for less than 100 on this ground
Best batting performance – 144 Jacques Du Toit for Leicestershire Foxes v. Glamorgan Dragons, 10 August 2008
Best bowling performance – 6/22 Adrian Dale for Glamorgan v. Durham, 20 June 1993

References

External links
 Colwyn Bay Cricket Club
 Cricinfo Website – Ground Page
 Cricket Archive page

Cricket grounds in Glamorgan
Glamorgan County Cricket Club
Stadiums in Wales
Rhos-on-Sea
Colwyn Bay